Retractor may refer to:

 Retractor (medical), a medical instrument
 Retractor (memory), a person
 Retractor (chess), type of a chess problem
 Retractor muscles in zoology